Richard G. Mason is an American businessman and politician from Maine. Mason is a Republican member of Maine House of Representatives for District 56.

Early life 
Mason graduated from Lisbon High School.

Career 
As a businessman, Mason is the owner of Rick Mason Excavation business.

In November 2017, Mason won a special election and became a Republican member of Maine House of Representatives for District 56. Mason succeeded his wife Gina Mason who died suddenly.

Personal life 
Mason's wife was Gina Mason. They have two children. Mason and his family live in Lisbon Falls, Maine.

One of Mason's son, Garrett Mason, is also a politician in Maine. In September 2017, Mason's wife died suddenly in Maine.

See also 
 Dale Crafts

References 

Living people
People from Lisbon, Maine
Businesspeople from Maine
Republican Party members of the Maine House of Representatives
Year of birth missing (living people)
21st-century American politicians